Small Town Singers is a musical group in Söderköping, Sweden. Established in 1967, the group scored several Svensktoppen successes during the mid-late 1970s and early 1980s. Sometimes, they still appear for sporadic performances.

Svensktoppen charting songs
"Hemlängtan" (one week, 1974)
"Dansen på Sunnanö" (elva veckor, 1974)
"Som stjärnor små" (one week, 1975)
"En sjömansvisa" (three weeks, 1975)
"Fritiofs avsked" (eleven weeks, 1975)
"Utövisan" (seven weeks, 1977)
"Sommarbrevet" (ten weeks, 1979)
"Jag gör så att blommorna blommar" (tio veckor, 1979)
"Jag har vandrat mina stigar" (three weeks, 1981)

References 

Musical groups established in 1967
Swedish musical groups
Östergötland County